Qeshlaq-e Najaf (also Romanized as Qeshlāq-e Najaf and Qeshlaq Najaf; also known as Qeshlāq-e Najafbeh) is a village in Khezel-e Sharqi Rural District, Khezel District, Nahavand County, Hamadan Province, Iran. At the 2006 census, its population was 228, in 43 families.

References 

Populated places in Nahavand County